Durán, is a canton located in the province of Guayas, Ecuador, near the confluence of the Daule & Babahoyo rivers, where the Guayas River enters the ocean. It is located across the Guayas River from Guayaquil. Its township or capital is Eloy Alfaro. The canton was created in 1986 during the presidential period of Leon Febres Cordero through a presidential decree. The name "Eloy Alfaro" was chosen because of the Ecuadorian ex-president Eloy Alfaro Delgado. According to the National census in 2010, there are 235,769 people residing within the canton limits. Many of its inhabitants commute to other places for work and it can be considered a "dormitory town". However, many people who live in Durán find work within the canton by opening "comedores" or small restaurants, selling produce at the market, or even opening little stores with basic produce and house necessities. The towns Durán, Samborondón, and Guayaquil are connected by the bridge Rafael Mendoza Avilés.

Durán is also well known for being the first railroad hub in Ecuador. It is the coastal railhead for the Ecuadorean rail network, and the closest point to Guayaquil because the railroad does not bridge the Guayas River. Since July 2007, a government program for the railroad reactivation began as well as the railroad connecting Duran with other cities located in the highlands of Ecuador. The Empresa de Ferrocarriles Ecuatorianos offers rail service aimed at tourists to Quito.

References

Populated places in Guayas Province